Catuti is a municipality in the north of the Brazilian state of Minas Gerais.  the population was 5,250 in a total area of . The elevation is  It became a municipality in 1997. The postal code (CEP) is 39526-000.

Catuti is part of the statistical microregion of Janaúba. It is surrounded by the following municipalities:

South and West: Pai Pedro
East:, Mato Verde
North: Monte Azul
It is connected by poor roads to the regional center of Janaúba to the south.

Inadequate rainfall, isolation, and poor soils make this one of the poorest municipalities in the state and in the country. The main economic activities are cattle raising (8,000 head in 2006) and farming with modest production of rice, beans, corn, and sorghum. Cropland made up  and natural pasture . There were only 36 tractors, a ratio of one for every 200 farms. In the urban area there were no financial institutions . There were 94 automobiles, giving a ratio of about one automobile for every 55 inhabitants. The Gross Domestic Product was R$3,110,000 (2005) and the GDP per capita was R$13,690 a year. Health care was provided by three public health clinics. There were no hospitals.

Municipal Human Development Index
MHDI: .605 (2000)
State ranking: 822 out of 853 municipalities 
National ranking: 4,569 out of 5,138 municipalities 
Life expectancy: 65
Literacy rate: 62.5
Combined primary, secondary and tertiary gross enrollment ratio: .760
Per capita income (monthly): R$66.72

See also
List of municipalities in Minas Gerais

References
IBGE

Municipalities in Minas Gerais